A muda was the convoy of merchant ships that usually left Venice in spring and came back in autumn.

In the earliest times, the mudas only visited ports in the Levant.  In later years, the ships sailed also to European ports. 

Along with merchants and goods, the mudas brought knowledge, new ideas and new cultures to Venice.

Sources
 

Republic of Venice
History of international trade